In chemistry, a phosphodiester bond occurs when exactly two of the hydroxyl groups in phosphoric acid react with hydroxyl groups on other molecules to form two ester bonds. The "bond" involves this linkage .  Discussion of phosphodiesters is dominated by their prevalence in DNA and RNA, but phosphodiesters occur in other biomolecules, e.g. acyl carrier proteins.

Phosphodiester bonds make up the backbones of DNA and RNA. The phosphate is attached to the 5' carbon. The 3' carbon of one sugar is bonded to the 5' phosphate of the adjacent sugar. Specifically, the phosphodiester bond links the 3' carbon atom of one sugar molecule and the 5' carbon atom of another (hence the name, 3', 5' phosphodiester linkage). These saccharide groups are derived from deoxyribose in DNA and ribose in RNA.  Phosphodiesters  are negatively charged at pH 7.  Repulsion between these negative charges influences the conformation of the polynucleic acids. The negative charge attracts histones, metal cations such as magnesium, and polyamines.

In order for the phosphodiester bond to be formed and the nucleotides to be joined, the tri-phosphate or di-phosphate forms of the nucleotide building blocks are broken apart to give off energy required to drive the enzyme-catalyzed reaction.

Hydrolysis of phosphodiester bonds is catalyzed by phosphodiesterases, which are involved in repairing DNA sequences.

The phosphodiester linkage between two ribonucleotides can be broken by alkaline hydrolysis, whereas the linkage between two deoxyribonucleotides is more stable under these conditions. The relative ease of RNA hydrolysis is an effect of the presence of the 2' hydroxyl group.

Enzyme activity 
A phosphodiesterase is an enzyme that catalyzes the hydrolysis of phosphodiester bonds, for instance a bond in a molecule of cyclic AMP or cyclic GMP.

An enzyme that plays an important role in the repair of oxidative DNA damage is the 3'-phosphodiesterase.

During the replication of DNA, there is a hole between the phosphates in the backbone left by DNA polymerase I. DNA ligase is able to form a phosphodiester bond between the nucleotides.

See also 
Phosphodiesterase
Phosphodiesterase inhibitor
DNA replication, DNA, ATP
Teichoic acid, DNase I
PDE5
Nick (DNA)

References

Organophosphates
Molecular biology
Biology and pharmacology of chemical elements